Gottfried "Göpf" Kottmann (15 October 1932 – 6 November 1964) was a Swiss rower and bobsledder who competed from the mid-1950s until his death by drowning shortly after his second Olympic appearance in 1964.

Rowing
Kottmann, born 1932 in Zürich, started rowing aged 13 with Belvoir Ruderclub in his home city. For several years, he rowed with Rolf Streuli and various coxswains in the coxed pair event. They won the European Rowing Championships in 1954 in Amsterdam, in 1955 in Ghent, and came second in 1956 in Bled. They had qualified for the 1956 Summer Olympics in Melbourne but Switzerland was one of four countries to boycott the Games over the Soviet invasion of Hungary. At the 1958 European Rowing Championships in Poznań, Kottmann and Streuli won bronze.

At the 1959 European Rowing Championships in Mâcon, Kottmann won a gold medal in the coxless four event. Two of the four rowers remained part of the coxless four that went to the 1960 Summer Olympics in Rome where they came sixth. At the 1964 European Rowing Championships in Amsterdam, he competed in single sculls and came in sixth place. Two months later competing at the 1964 Summer Olympics in Tokyo, he won a bronze medal in the single sculls event.

Bobsledding
Kottmann won a bronze medal in the four-man bobsleigh event at the 1960 FIBT World Championships in Cortina d'Ampezzo.

Death
He drowned in the Rhine at Rüdlingen while taking part in a military exercise as a diver.

References

1932 births
1964 deaths
Deaths by drowning
Swiss male bobsledders
Swiss male rowers
Olympic bronze medalists for Switzerland
Olympic rowers of Switzerland
Rowers at the 1960 Summer Olympics
Rowers at the 1964 Summer Olympics
Olympic medalists in rowing
Accidental deaths in Switzerland
Medalists at the 1964 Summer Olympics
European Rowing Championships medalists
Sportspeople from Zürich
20th-century Swiss people